Chelles–Gournay is a railway station in Chelles, Seine-et-Marne, France. The station opened in 1849 and is on the Paris-Est–Strasbourg-Ville railway. The station is served by Transilien line P (East Paris) and RER Line E services operated by the SNCF. It will also see services operated by Grand Paris Express (Paris Metro Line 16) in the future.

History
Since 14 July 1999, the RER E serves the station. Between 1999 and 2007 the station was rebuilt to make way for the LGV Est, which included the building of new entrances to the station.

Train services
The station is served by the following services:

Commuter services (RER E) from Haussmann–Saint-Lazare to Chelles–Gournay
Regional services (Transilien P) from Paris-Est to Meaux
 Paris Metro Line 16 from Saint-Denis Pleyel to Noisy-Champs in the future as part of Grand Paris Express.

Bus services
The station is served by services including:

Apolo7 bus lines 1, 2, 3, 4, 6, 7, 8, 8s, 9 and 9s
Seine-et-Marne Express line 19
RATP Group lines 113 and 213
TRA bus line 613
Noctilien night bus lines N23 and N141

Gallery

External links

 
Île-de-France Network Map
Transilien website

Réseau Express Régional stations
Railway stations in Seine-et-Marne
Railway stations in France opened in 1849
Paris Métro line 16